Andover is a village in Henry County, Illinois, United States. The population was 578 at the 2010 census, down from 594 in 2000.

History

Andover is the oldest community in Henry County. Andover was the first area to be settled as a town within the county and the first mill was built in 1836-37. Andover some became a hub of wagon trails.

Andover was founded in September, 1835 by the Reverend Ithamar Pillsbury, as an agent for the Andover Colony. Pillsbury, who had been a corporal in the War of 1812 attached in the New Hampshire military, narrowly escaping death in the war which had convinced him to become a Presbyterian minister.

Lars Paul Esbjörn, a Swedish Lutheran minister in the United States, and a group of Swedish immigrants arrived in Andover during 1849. Together they built Jenny Lind Chapel, which became the "mother church" of the Swedish Lutheran community. The church was built with funding provided mainly by the Swedish singer, Jenny Lind, while she was at that time on a concert tour in the eastern United States. The cemetery adjacent to the Chapel is the resting place of Jonas Swensson, the second president of the Augustana Synod.

After remodeling in 1948, Jenny Lind Chapel was dedicated as a shrine of the Augustana Evangelical Lutheran Church.  In 1975, Jenny Lind Chapel was declared to be a National Historic Site and was listed in the National Register of Historic Places.

Geography
Andover is located at  (41.295011, -90.290658).

Demographics

As of the census of 2000, there were 594 people, 220 households, and 174 families residing in the village. The racial makeup of the village was 98.48% White, 0.17% Native American, 0.84% Asian, and 0.51% from two or more races. Hispanic or Latino of any race were 0.84% of the population. 27.8% were of Swedish, 26.8% German, 10.2% Irish, 7.7% English and 5.7% American ancestry according to Census 2000.

There were 220 households, out of which 34.5% had children under the age of 18 living with them, 70.9% were married couples living together, 6.4% had a female householder with no husband present, and 20.5% were non-families. 16.8% of all households were made up of individuals, and 8.2% had someone living alone who was 65 years of age or older.  The average household size was 2.70 and the average family size was 3.06.

In the village, the population was spread out, with 26.1% under the age of 18, 7.1% from 18 to 24, 26.1% from 25 to 44, 27.9% from 45 to 64, and 12.8% who were 65 years of age or older.  The median age was 40 years. For every 100 females, there were 96.0 males.  For every 100 females age 18 and over, there were 97.7 males.

The median income for a household in the village was $46,944, and the median income for a family was $49,821. Males had a median income of $40,000 versus $26,625 for females. The per capita income for the village was $18,439.  About 4.1% of families and 5.9% of the population were below the poverty line, including 7.1% of those under age 18 and 17.8% of those age 65 or over.

References

External links
City of Andover
 Jenny Lind Chapel

Villages in Henry County, Illinois
Villages in Illinois
Populated places established in 1835